Salvatore Nicolosi  (20 February 1922 – 10 January 2014) was an Italian Prelate of Roman Catholic Church.

Nicolosi was born in Pedara, Italy and was ordained a priest on 22 October 1944. Nicolosi was appointed as bishop to the Diocese of Lipari on 21 March 1963 and ordained bishop on 21 April 1963. Nicolosi was appointed bishop of the Diocese of Noto on 27 June 1970 and retired from the diocese on 19 June 1998.

External links
Catholic-Hierarchy
Diocese of Noto (Italian)

20th-century Italian Roman Catholic bishops
Participants in the Second Vatican Council
1922 births
2014 deaths